Romania competed at the 1988 Summer Olympics in Seoul, South Korea. 68 competitors, 32 men and 36 women, took part in 59 events in 10 sports.

Medalists

Competitors
The following is the list of number of competitors in the Games.

Athletics

Men's High Jump
 Sorin Matei

Women's 1,500 metres
 Paula Ivan
 Doina Melinte

Women's 3,000 metres
 Paula Ivan
 Maricica Puică

Women's High Jump
 Galina Astafei

Boxing

Canoeing

Fencing

Two female fencers represented Romania in 1988.

Women's foil
 Elisabeta Guzganu-Tufan
 Reka Zsofia Lazăr-Szabo

Gymnastics

Rowing

Shooting

Swimming

Women's 50m Freestyle
 Tamara Costache
 Heat – 26.06
 Final – 25.80 (→ 6th place)

 Liliana Dobrescu
 Heat – 26.56 (→ did not advance, 17th place)

Women's 100m Freestyle
 Liliana Dobrescu
 Heat – 56.67
 B-Final – 56.79 (→ 11th place)

 Tamara Costache
 Heat – 56.79
 B-Final – 57.11 (→ 16th place)

Women's 200m Freestyle
 Liliana Dobrescu
 Heat – 2:01.93
 B-Final – 2:01.98 (→ 12th place)

 Stela Marian Pura
 Heat – 2:02.26
 B-Final – 2:02.30 (→ 13th place)

Women's 400m Freestyle
 Noemi Lung
 Heat – 4:12.42
 B-Final – 4:11.68 (→ 10th place)

 Stela Marian Pura
 Heat – 4:15.78
 B-Final – 4:12.14 (→ 11th place)

Women's 100m Backstroke
 Aneta Patrscoiu
 Heat – 1:03.29
 B-Final – 1:03.33 (→ 9th place)

Women's 200m Backstroke
 Aneta Patrscoiu
 Heat – 2:17.25
 B-Final – 2:15.75 (→ 9th place)

Women's 100m Butterfly
 Stela Marian Pura
 Heat – 1:03.91 (→ did not advance, 24th place)

Women's 200m Butterfly
 Stela Marian Pura
 Heat – 2:12.53
 Final – 2:11.28 (→ 4th place)

Women's 200m Individual Medley
 Noemi Lung
 Heat – 2:15.55
 Final – 2:14.85 (→  Bronze Medal)

 Aneta Patrascoiu
 Heat – 2:17.39
 Final – 2:16.70 (→ 6th place)

Women's 400m Individual Medley
 Noemi Lung
 Heat – 4:41.96
 Final – 4:39.46 (→  Silver Medal)

Weightlifting

Wrestling

References

Nations at the 1988 Summer Olympics
1988
1988 in Romanian sport